Split Image is a crime novel by Robert B. Parker, the ninth and final novel in his Jesse Stone series. It was published a month after his death.

Plot summary

The novel begins with Chief Stone investigating the murder of a man Suit finds crammed into the trunk of an abandoned car. The man turns out to be Petrov Ognowski, a tough guy for local mob boss Reggie Galen. Jesse then goes to the Galen residence to interview him. While there he meets Galen’s beautiful and submissive wife, Rebecca Bangston. Envious of the life that Galen has with his wife, Jesse tailspins into a drinking binge, wondering why his wife couldn’t have been like that. Despite his increased drinking, he continues to investigate and discovers that Galen’s neighbor is another mob boss named Knocko Moynihan and is married to Rebecca’s twin sister, Roberta Bangston.

Soon after the first murder, Knocko Moynihan is found murdered. Jesse begins to suspect the wives, leading Jesse and Suit to the Bangston’s hometown. There they discover that their mother is a widow, and that their father was involved in criminal activities with the girl’s husbands, who had met in prison twenty years earlier. While investigating they also discover the girls promiscuous past. Apparently they made a game of having sex with men and seeing if he could tell which one was which throughout. This activity got them the nickname “The Bang Bang Twins.” Jesse wonders if they have continued this behavior. During an interview with the twins later, they strip naked and try to seduce Jesse with their sex game, confirming his suspicions. He resists.

Meanwhile, the father and widow of Ognowski come to Chief Stone demanding that he solve the murder. Jesse assures them he will do his best, however, the widow takes it upon herself to start sleeping with one of Galen’s bodyguards. The bodyguard admits that he killed both her husband and Knocko. The wives had been having sex with Petrov, and when Knocko found out about it he had the bodyguard kill Petrov. Later the twins decided they wanted Knocko killed, so they came to Reggie with a story about Knocko abusing Roberta. Furious that Knocko abused his wife’s sister, he has the same bodyguard kill Knocko.

Jesse confronts the bodyguard with this information in his office along with Ognowski’s large mobster father, and presents him with two options. One, he can roll over on Reggie Galen, or two, he can leave and take his chances with the elder Ognowski. He chooses the former. Galen is arrested for the murders, and even though the wives were behind the whole thing, Jesse has nothing to charge them with. He leaves them to Ognowski.

Subplots
Half of the novel is consumed by a major subplot involving Sunny Randall and a religious cult. Sunny is hired by the parents of a troubled teen to rescue her from the commune she is living on. However, when Sunny interviews the teen she finds that she is happy to be there and in no apparent danger. The cult involves free love and sex, but with the girl being over eighteen, Sunny finds her hands tied, and reports this to the parents.

A short time later, the cult leader reports that the girl has gone missing. Sunny does some investigating which leads her to one of the girl’s shady lawyers. In an attempt to find the girl she approaches the lawyer telling him that she heard he can arrange kidnappings of troubled teens so they can be medically treated. He agrees to help her, and tells her the place that he has his kidnapped teens sent. Sunny then enlists Spike’s help to stake out the place. She confronts the institution’s director who denies that the girl is there. Sunny advises that she will return with the police and a warrant to find the girl. Then she and Spike hide outside suspecting they will try to move her. When they do, Spike intercepts her and they take her to Spike’s place.

The girl decides to return to the commune, but a short time later she reports that she was forced to have sex with strange men. It turns out that the cult leader was running short of money, so he began holding fund raisers. At these fundraisers, older men would attend, donate money, and in turn be given sex with the young female members of the cult. Sunny presents this information to Jesse, who confronts the cult leader with the information they have. The cult leader agrees to leave town.

The novel also relates the growing relationship between Jesse and Sunny. With Jenn and Richie out of the picture, Jesse and Sunny are free to pursue their relationship with each other. During his therapy sessions with Dix, Jesse discovers that it was his impression of Galen’s control over his already submissive wife that made him so envious of their relationship. This leads him to realize that it was his need to control Jenn that drove her away. Meanwhile, Sunny, with the help of her therapist, Dr. Silverman (the longtime love interest of another Parker character, Spenser), discovers that it was her fear of being controlled by her husband that she saw as so perfect, that drove her from him. This is largely due to her fear of becoming her mother who was controlled by her perfect father. Jesse’s flaws, particularly his struggle with alcohol, are what draw Sunny to him. She doesn’t want someone perfect like she perceived Richie and her father to be. With their newfound realizations, Jesse and Sunny decide to take their relationship to a more serious level. The novel ends with the two confessing that they are falling in love with each other.

References

Jesse Stone (novel series)
Novels by Robert B. Parker
2010 American novels
Novels published posthumously
American detective novels
G. P. Putnam's Sons books